Melierax is a genus of bird of prey in the family Accipitridae. Established by George Robert Gray in 1840, it contains the following species:

The name Melierax is a combination of the Greek words melos, meaning "song" and hierax, meaning "hawk".

References

External links

 
Bird genera
 
Taxa named by George Robert Gray
Taxonomy articles created by Polbot